Amaala International Airport is an international airport, designed by Sir Norman Foster, in an ultra-luxury resort located along the western coast of Saudi Arabia, between Neom and Red Sea Project. The airport is due completion by 2023, and it will accommodate around 1 million travellers per year. Inspired by the optical illusion of a desert mirage, the airport draws it inspiration from the natural environment of where it exists.

See also 

 Neom Airport
 Amaala
 Saudi Vision 2030

References

 Engr Raja Sheraz Ahmed,

Airports in Saudi Arabia
Proposed airports